The Explorer or The Explorers may refer to:

Science and Industry 
 The Explorer, a Jungian archetype
 Abrams P-1 Explorer, a 1937 aircraft by Talbert Abrams, the first designed exclusively for aerial photography
 The Explorers Club,  an international society with the goal of promoting scientific exploration
 The Explorer Group, a UK manufacturer of caravans
 The Explorer Motor Company, dedicated to the mass production of futuristic Straker cars used in the UFO TV series, company never got off the ground
 The Explorers' Museum, in Charleville Castle that also serves as a global expedition base

Culture

Music 
 The Explorers, a 1980's rock band of Phil Manzanera, Andy Mackay and James Wraith
 The Explorers Club, a Pop rock band originally from the coast of South Carolina
 The Explorer, the 1996 album by E-Type
 "The Explorer", a track on the 1985 Dealing with It! album by D.R.I.
 "The Explorer", a track on the 1989 Shotgun Messiah album
 "The Explorer", a track on the 1996  The Second Coming album by Napoleon XIV
 "The Explorer", a track on the 2002 Visions from the Spiral Generator album by Vintersorg
 "The Explorers", a 2009 single by CFCF featuring Sally Shapiro
 "The Explorer", a track on the 2011 Time album by Steve Howe
 "The Explorer", a composition for the 1996 Olympics by James Oliverio, it was later retitled "To Boldly Go..."
 The Explorers: A Century of Discovery, its 1988 soundtrack by Lee Holdridge
 Last Of The Explorers, a recording studio located in Portland, Oregon, with albums such as Zero to 99
 The Explorers, a version of first aid kits by Pac-Kit

Theatre, film, television and photography 
 The Explorer (film), a lost 1915 American adventure silent film
 The Explorer Channel, available in many places, e.g. UNC-TV
 The Explorers, a French ultra-high definition television content producer; see Ultra Nature
 The Explorers and Early Colonists of Victoria, an 1872 historical photographic montage of early settlers in Victoria by Thomas Foster Chuck
 Once Upon a Time... The Explorers, French (Il était une fois... les Explorateurs) animated TV series from 1996, by the studio Procidis
 The Explorer, a role played by Liza Koshy in Season 2, Episode 5 of Escape the Night
 The Explorer, a role of in the 1996 premiering production of Quidam by Cirque du Soleil
 "The Explorer", a 1960 episode in the Alcoa Presents: One Step Beyond TV series
 "The Explorers", a 1960 episode of Lassie
 The Explorers, a marionette production by Peter Scriven
 The Explorers, a 1968 film version
 The Explorers, a 1972-1976 CBC nature documentary series, narrated by Leslie Nielsen.
 The Explorers, a 1973 ABC TV series by Andrew Solt
 The Explorers, a 1975 BBC Natural History Unit series, narrated by David Attenborough
 "The Explorers", a 1986 episode of Rainbow, a BBC children's TV series
 "The Explorers' Coast", a 2014 episode of the BBC Coast TV series
 "The Explorers", a 2016 episode of the I Want My Phone Back game show web television series
 "The Explorers", a 2017 episode of Hyori's Homestay, a South Korean television program

Art 
 The Explorer, a sculpture by Ng Eng Teng located at the entrance of the Singapore Art Museum

Print 
 The Explorer, a 1908 novel by Somerset Maugham
The Explorer, a 1964 novel by Frances Parkinson Keyes
The Explorer, a 1975 novel by Philip Temple
The Explorer, a 2017 children's book by Katherine Rundell
 "The Explorer", a poem by Rudyard Kipling within his 1903 The Five Nations
The Explorer King: Adventure, Science, and the Great Diamond Hoax – Clarence King in the Old West, a 2006 book by Robert Wilson
 The Explorers, a 1982 book by Vivian Stuart (as William Stuart Long)
 The Explorers, a 1984 book by Australian television journalist Bill Peach
The Explorers, a 2013 children's book on cross-cultural encounters by Oren Ginzburg
 The Explorers (collection), a collection of science fiction stories by American writer C. M. Kornbluth
The Explorers and Other Poems, an 1874 volume by Catherine Martin
The Explorers, a magazine founded in 1957 by Lu Wenfu
"The Explorers", fourth chapter in the historical novel Alaska by James A. Michener
The Explorers of Callisto, a 1930 work by American mechanical engineer and science fiction author Harl Vincent
 The Explorers, the 2nd volume within a 2014 English translation of Le Transperceneige, a science fiction post-apocalyptic French graphic novel by Jacques Lob and Jean-Marc Rochette
 The Northwest Explorer, a weekly newspaper in Tucson, Arizona
 Ang Tagatuklas (The Explorer), the official broadsheet of Regional Science High School for Region 1 published in Filipino
 Exploration and Empire:  The Explorer and the Scientist in the Winning of the American West, a 1966 work by American historian William H. Goetzmann

Sports 
 The Explorers, the local name for the Aguada Explorers (formerly Road City Explorers) American Empire Professional Baseball League
 The Explorers, the local name for the Bradenton Explorers senior professional baseball team of Florida
 The Explorers, the athletics teams of Hudson High School (Ohio)
 The Explorers, the local name for the Kansas City Explorers tennis team of Missouri/Kansas
 The Explorers, the nickname for La Salle Explorers of Philadelphia, the varsity sports teams from La Salle University
 The Explorers, the local name for the Sioux City Explorers professional baseball team of Iowa

Miscellaneous 
 Explorers Grand Slam, an adventurers' challenge
 The Explorer, a route of Blacksburg Transit
 The Explorer, the newly chosen Phoenix King in Games Workshop's Warhammer Fantasy setting
 The Explorer´s Dome, an area within the Harmanecká Cave

See also 
 The Sexplorer, role of The Explorer played by Monika Ringwald
 Explorer (disambiguation)